Christian Latouche (born 1939/1940) is a French billionaire businessman, and the founder, owner and CEO of Fiducial SA, a global accounting company.

References

Living people
French billionaires
French company founders
French chief executives
Year of birth missing (living people)